Steven James Brody (May 22, 1970 – February 22, 2019), known professionally as Brody Stevens, was an American stand-up comedian and actor. He starred in the Comedy Central reality series Brody Stevens: Enjoy It!, and was known for appearances on Chelsea Lately and other comedy shows as well as roles in films such as The Hangover (2009) and Due Date (2010).

Early life
Stevens was born Steven Brody in Los Angeles, California on May 22, 1970. Stevens' family is from New Mexico and Arizona. His grandmother was born in New Mexico on May 2, 1909. His father, Harold Morris Brody, was born in Phoenix and worked as a private investigator. Stevens described his family as the "pioneering Jews of the southwest". Stevens was raised in Los Angeles, and briefly enrolled in private school until his mother decided he would attend public school. The family moved to Sacramento during Stevens' early childhood. After his parents divorced when Stevens was eight years old, he lived with his mother and older sister in the San Fernando Valley. Stevens did not go to Hebrew School nor read from the Torah for his Bar Mitzvah. In 1982, Stevens attended a nondenominational Christian church with his father, who was dating a member of the choir.

He attended Reseda High School, excelling on the baseball team as a right-handed pitcher. His highs included striking out 10 batters on multiple occasions (he was often clocked on the radar gun at 88MPH with movement), while his lows included balking in runs in playoff games. Stevens went on to earn a scholarship to play Division I College Baseball for the Arizona State Sun Devils baseball program, starting in four games, pitching 28 innings and recording 3 saves.  He graduated with a 2.52 GPA.

Career
Stevens first tried stand-up in Los Angeles, before moving to Seattle, where he began developing an act, in addition to co-creating and co-starring in a public-access television show with Teina Manu called Brody and Teina that garnered a cult following. His career continued for a three-year stint in New York City, before he found a home on the Los Angeles comedy scene.

Stevens appeared on the television shows Late Night with Conan O'Brien, Jimmy Kimmel Live!, Late Friday, Premium Blend, The Late Late Show with Craig Kilborn, The Test with Jillian Barberie, Late World with Zach, The Best Damn Sports Show Period, Attack of the Show!, Childrens Hospital, Tosh.0, TMZ on TV, Fox NFL Sunday, Conan, Comedy Bang! Bang!, The Burn with Jeff Ross, Kroll Show, The Ben Show and @midnight. He was also a regular panelist on Chelsea Lately.

In 2010, Stevens launched his own podcast The Brody Stevens Experiment. Only three episodes were released. On October 7, 2011 Stevens began co-hosting Brode & Esther, a podcast for the Deathsquad network with fellow stand-up comedians Esther Povitsky and Brian Redban. 15 episodes have been released.

In 2011, Stevens starred in and produced a documentary comedy series for HBO called Brody Stevens: Enjoy It!. Zach Galifianakis was an executive producer on the project. It was released in 2012 as six 15-minute episodes on HBO's digital platform HBO GO and received positive reviews. Following the popularity of his HBO program it was picked up by Comedy Central as Brody Stevens: Enjoy It!. The footage was shot by HBO, along with additional material shot by Comedy Central, and was released in 2013 as twelve 21-minute episodes.

Stevens was also an experienced audience warm-up performer and did warm-up on The Best Damn Sports Show Period, Late World with Zach, The Man Show, Chelsea Lately, The Burn with Jeff Ross, The Jeselnik Offensive, Rob Dyrdek's Ridiculousness, Who Gets the Last Laugh?, @midnight, The Exes, and Why? with Hannibal Buress.

Stevens also appeared in the films Road to Park City, Jesus Is Magic (2005), The Hangover (2009), I Am Comic (2010), Due Date (2010), and The Hangover Part II (2011). He also appeared in a minor role in Funny People (2009), but his scenes were ultimately cut from the film.

Stevens launched another podcast on May 13, 2012 called The Steven Brody Stevens Festival of Friendship on the Feral Audio network. The podcast was a mixture of Stevens talking about his career and personal life, involving his producer Dustin Marshall and interviewing his friends from throughout the comedy world. 69 episodes were released. On November 13, 2013 Stevens launched his latest podcasting venture as the host of Positive Push on the Video Podcast Network YouTube channel, an affiliate of the Jash network.

Stevens was also a frequent podcast guest. He regularly appeared on Deathsquad podcasts such as Kill Tony, and appeared on The Joe Rogan Experience as well as The Naughty Show with Sam Tripoli. Stevens also had a presence in the alternative comedy podcast scene, appearing as a contestant on Doug Loves Movies and guest on Earwolf podcasts such as Who Charted? with Howard Kremer and Kulap Vilaysack. In addition, Stevens regularly appeared as a guest on Jay Mohr's sports radio show Jay Mohr Sports.

Stevens performed in a wide range of comedy clubs across Los Angeles and was famous for his late-night spots at the Comedy Store. On February 27, 2013, Stevens taped a live comedy set at The Royale in Boston for the second season of Comedy Central's The Half Hour. While in Boston, he also recorded a series of interviews with the other 16 comedians appearing on The Half Hour called Push & Believe. It was released on Comedy Central's YouTube channel in December 2013. Through the summer of 2013, he traveled the country performing on the Oddball Comedy Tour headlined by Dave Chappelle.

Roughly a year prior to his death, starting in 2018, Stevens served as a co-host on the Barstool Sports Sirius XM radio show, Dialed in with Dallas, hosted by former MLB Pitcher Dallas Braden.

Death
On February 22, 2019, Stevens was found dead in his Los Angeles home. An autopsy determined that he died by suicide. He was 48 years old. He had been suffering from bipolar disorder and depression at the time of his death.

Filmography

References

External links

1970 births
2019 deaths
21st-century American male actors
American stand-up comedians
Arizona State Sun Devils baseball players
Jewish American male actors
People from the San Fernando Valley
Male actors from Los Angeles
Comedians from California
21st-century American comedians
Jewish American male comedians
People with bipolar disorder
Suicides by hanging in California
2019 suicides
21st-century American Jews